Josef Jüttner (12 September 1775, Bernartice – 27 April 1848, Prague) was a cartographer and Austrian army general, author of the first exact map of Prague based on geodetic measurement.

Life

Jüttner studied at the gymnasium in Bílá Voda near Javorník. In 1793, he entered the Austrian army, and between 1794–95 fought against France. He spent the years 1799–1800 as an artillery soldier in Ingolstadt, where he attended lectures on mathematics and physics at the Jesuit University.

Starting in 1801, Jüttner taught at the mathematical school in Prague. In 1808 Jüttner became the director of this school.

The etching for the map was done by Prague's graphic master ; the lettering by Alois Mussil. In 1818  Franz Anton von Kolowrat-Liebsteinsky issued a number of good quality copies of the map under the title Grundriß der königlichen Hauptstadt Prag at a scale of 500 Viennese lots (60 lots = 1 finger).

References

1775 births
1848 deaths
People from Jeseník District
Military personnel from Prague

19th-century cartographers
Austrian cartographers
Austrian generals